Ngô Tuấn Trung (born October 2, 1985) is a Vietnamese professional basketball player for the Thang Long Warriors of the Vietnam Basketball Association (VBA).

Pro career
Ngô joined the Heat in their second season of the ABL.

Career statistics

VBA

|-
| style="text-align:left;"| 2016
| style="text-align:left;"| Hochiminh City
| 20 || 14 || 25.6  || .460 || .350 || .560 || 3.0 || 5.7 || 1.4 || .3 || 3.1
|- class"sortbottom"
| style="text-align:left;"| 2017
| style="text-align:left;"| Hochiminh City
| 8 || 6 || 20.1  || .280 || .180 || .560 || 3.4 || 3.4 || 1.8 || .1 || 2.5
|- class"sortbottom"
| style="text-align:center;" colspan="2"| Career
| 28 || 20 || 23.3 || .370 || .270 || .560 || 3.2 || 4.6 || 1.6 || .2 || 2.8

References

External links
 Career statistics and player information from ASEANBasketballLeague.com

1985 births
Living people
Vietnamese basketball players
Saigon Heat players
Point guards
Sportspeople from Ho Chi Minh City